Mattia Giardi (born 15 December 1991) is a Sammarinese footballer who plays as a defender for Faetano and the San Marino national team.

International career
Giardi made his international debut for San Marino on 8 September 2018, starting in the 2018–19 UEFA Nations League D match against Belarus, which finished as a 0–5 away loss.

Career statistics

International

References

External links
 
 
 

1991 births
Living people
Sammarinese footballers
San Marino international footballers
San Marino under-21 international footballers
San Marino youth international footballers
Association football defenders